Duncan Cameron Fraser (1 October 1845 – 27 September 1910) was a Canadian lawyer, politician, judge, and the ninth Lieutenant Governor of Nova Scotia.

He was born in Pictou County, Nova Scotia, the son of Alexander Fraser and Ann Chisholm. He studied at Dalhousie College, went on to article in law, was admitted to the bar in 1873 and set up practice in New Glasgow. He married Bessie Grant Graham in 1878. In the same year, he ran unsuccessfully for a seat in the provincial assembly. Fraser was a member of the province's Legislative Council from 1887 to 1891, also serving as a minister without portfolio in the Executive Council. He was elected to the House of Commons of Canada for the riding of Guysborough in the 1891 federal election. A Liberal, he was re-elected in the 1896 and 1900 elections.

From 1904 to 1906, he was a judge of the Supreme Court of Nova Scotia. In 1906, he was appointed lieutenant governor of Nova Scotia and served until his death in 1910.

His daughter, Margaret Marjory Fraser, was a nursing sister in World War I. She, then 33 years old, served as the matron of the 14 nurses on the last voyage of the hospital ship HMHS Llandovery Castle when it was torpedoed and sunk by a German submarine in 1918. All of the 14 nurses died. His son, Lieut. James Gibson Laurier Fraser, was killed in action in France on 4 March 1918, aged 22; another son, Alistair Fraser, served as Lieutenant-Governor of Nova Scotia from 1952 to 1958.

Electoral record

References

 
 

1845 births
1910 deaths
Liberal Party of Canada MPs
Nova Scotia Liberal Party MLCs
Lieutenant Governors of Nova Scotia
Members of the House of Commons of Canada from Nova Scotia
Judges in Nova Scotia